Alberto Pérez-Gómez  (born 24 December 1949) is an architectural historian and theorist known for taking a phenomenological approach to architecture. He lives in Montreal.

Biography
Born December 24, 1949, in Mexico City he graduated as an engineer and architect from the National Polytechnic Institute of Mexico. Afterwards he did postgraduate work at Cornell University. He then pursued graduate studies in the History and Theory of Architecture at the University of Essex where he received his Master of Arts in 1975 and Ph.D. in 1979.  In 1987 he became a Canadian Citizen and a Quebec resident. In 1984, he won the Alice Davis Hitchcock Award for his book Architecture and the Crisis of Modern Science. He has taught and lectured at various schools of architecture around the world and was director of the Carleton University School of Architecture from 1983 to 1986. Currently, he runs the History and Theory of Architecture program at the McGill University School of Architecture, where he is the Saidye Rosner Bronfman Professor in History and Theory of Architecture.

Dr. Pérez-Gómez is the author of numerous volumes of architectural scholarship. Polyphilo or The Dark Forest Revisited (MIT Press, 1992), an erotic narrative/theory of architecture that retells the love story of the famous fifteenth century novel/treatise Hypnerotomachia Poliphili in late twentieth-century terms, a text that has become the source of numerous projects and exhibitions (http://www.polyphilo.com). A Spanish version translated by the author was published as El Sueño de Polyfilo. El Origen Erótico del Significado Arquitectónico (Universidad Iberoamericana, 2012). He was co-editor of the well-known book series CHORA: Intervals in the Philosophy of Architecture vol. 1-7 (McGill-Queen's University Press) together with Stephen Parcell, which collects essays exploring fundamental questions concerning the practice of architecture through its history and theories. He co-authored a major book with Louise Pelletier, Architectural Representation and the Perspective Hinge (MIT Press, 1997), tracing the history and theory of modern European architectural representation, with special reference to the role of projection in architectural design. In Built Upon Love: Architectural Longing after Ethics and Aesthetics (MIT Press, 2006), Pérez-Gómez examines points of convergence between ethics and poetics in architectural history and philosophy, and draws important conclusions for contemporary practice. His most recent title, Attunement, Architectural Meaning after the Crisis of Modern Science (MIT Press, 2016) calls for an architecture that can enhance our human values and capacities, an architecture that is connected—attuned—to its location and its inhabitants. Architecture, Pérez-Gómez explains, operates as a communicative setting for societies; its beauty and its meaning lie in its connection to human health and self-understanding.

Publications
Attunement: Architectural Meaning after the Crisis of Modern Science (2016) 
Timely Meditations: Architectural Theories and Practices (Selected Essays on Architecture), vol.1 (2016) 
Timely Meditations: Architectural Philosophy and Hermeneutics (Selected Essays on Architecture), vol.2 (2016) 
Built upon Love: Architectural Longing after Ethics and Aesthetics (2006) 
Architectural Representation and the Perspective Hinge with Louise Pelletier (2003) 
Anamorphosis (1997) 
Polyphilo, or, The Dark Forest Revisited : an Erotic Epiphany of Architecture (1992) 
Architecture and the Crisis of Modern Science (1983) 
Lo Bello y lo Justo en Arquitectura (2015) 
Alberto Pérez-Gómez. De la Educación en Arquitectura (2014) 
El Sueño de Polyfilo. El Origen Erótico del Significado Arquitectónico (2012)

Awards and recognitions
Officer of the Order of Canada (2022)
Profesor Honoris Causa, International Institute of Hermeneutics (2021)
Award for Outstanding Achievement,  Architecture, Culture, and Spirituality Forum (2021)
Droga Architect in Residence Fellowship Sydney Australia (2017) 
David Thomson Award for Excellence in Graduate Supervision and Teaching McGill University (2008)
Canadian Personalities Exchange Programme Award Israel Association of Canadian Studies, The Hebrew University of Jerusalem, Israel, (2007) 
Fellowship from the Institute of Arts and Humanities of the Pennsylvania State University (2007)
Juan O’Gorman Medal (1999) For 25 years of distinguished service in Architectural Education, IPN, Mexico
Alice Davies Hitchcock Book Award (1983)  Granted by the Society of Architectural Historians for Architecture and the Crisis of Modern Science as "the most distinguished work of scholarship in the history of architecture published in North America between Nov. 1, 1981 to Oct. 31, 1983."Alice Davis Hitchcock Award
Fellow of the Mexican Academy of Architecture (1980)

See also
Hypnerotomachia Poliphili
Marco Frascari
Gregory Henriquez
Joseph Rykwert
Dalibor Vesely
Nader El-Bizri
David Leatherbarrow
Robert Tavernor
Louise Pelletier
Lily Chi
Marc J. Neveu
Lisa Landrum
Peter Olshavsky
Jason Crow
Architecture theory
McGill University School of Architecture
 Stylianos Giamarelos (2015) Interdisciplinary Deflections: Histories of the Scientific Revolution in Alberto Pérez-Gómez's Architecture and the Crisis of Modern Science. Journal of Architectural Education Vol. 69, Iss. 1, http://www.tandfonline.com/doi/full/10.1080/10464883.2015.987069

References

External links
McGill University faculty page
History and Theory of Architecture homepage
Hermeneutics as Architectural Discourse article
Modern Architecture, Abstraction, and the Poetic Imagination

20th-century Canadian historians
Canadian male non-fiction writers
Mexican emigrants to Canada
1949 births
Living people
Architectural historians
Instituto Politécnico Nacional alumni
People from Mexico City
Alumni of the University of Essex
Academic staff of McGill University
Academic staff of Carleton University
Architectural theoreticians
21st-century Canadian historians
Officers of the Order of Canada